(What's the Story) Morning Glory? is the second studio album by English rock band Oasis. Released on 2 October 1995 by Creation Records, it was produced by Owen Morris and the group's lead guitarist and main songwriter Noel Gallagher. The structure and arrangement style of the album were a significant departure from the group's previous album Definitely Maybe (1994). Gallagher's compositions were more focused in balladry and placed more emphasis on "huge" choruses, with the string arrangements and more varied instrumentation contrasting with the rawness of the group's debut album. Morning Glory was the group's first album with drummer Alan White, who replaced Tony McCarroll (though McCarroll still appeared on the album, drumming on the track "Some Might Say").

The record propelled Oasis from being a crossover indie act to a worldwide rock phenomenon, and is seen by critics as a significant record in the timeline of British indie music. Morning Glory sold a record-breaking 345,000 copies in its first week in the UK before going on to spend 10 weeks at number one on the UK Albums Chart. It was also the band's breakthrough in America, reaching number four on the US Billboard 200 and being certified 4× platinum there. The album yielded four major hit singles in the band's native Britain: "Some Might Say" and "Don't Look Back in Anger" reached number one, and "Roll with It" and "Wonderwall" peaked at number two; the latter spent a then lengthy 30 consecutive weeks on the chart during its initial run and emerged as the band's biggest selling UK hit. "Champagne Supernova" and "Wonderwall" reached number one on the Billboard Alternative Songs chart. At the 1996 Brit Awards, the album won Best British Album. Over several months in 1995 and 1996, the band supported the album with an extensive world tour, which saw them play to among the largest audiences ever at the time.

Although a commercial success, the record initially received lukewarm reviews from mainstream critics; many reviewers deemed it inferior to Definitely Maybe, with the songwriting and production particular points of criticism. However, critical opinion towards the album completely reversed in the ensuing months and years, with critics recognising its strengths and its "populist appeal". Despite the acclaim surrounding it being lesser today due to its intensive media hype at the time, Morning Glory is still considered a seminal record of both the Britpop era and the 1990s in general. The album has also appeared on several lists of the greatest albums in rock music, and at the 2010 Brit Awards, it was named the greatest British album since 1980. It has sold over 22 million copies worldwide, making it one of the best-selling albums of all time. As of October 2018, it is the UK's fifth best-selling album and third best-selling studio album of all time, having been certified 16× platinum and selling 4.94 million copies. It was also the UK's best-selling album of the 1990s, and is currently the second-longest charting studio album in the UK, having spent over 500 weeks on the UK Album Chart.

Background and recording
In May 1995, in the wake of the critical and commercial success of their 1994 debut album, Definitely Maybe, Oasis began recording Morning Glory at Rockfield Studios in Wales, with Owen Morris and Noel Gallagher producing. By the time they had finished in June 1995, Oasis were on the brink of becoming one of the most popular bands in the UK; the August 1995 "Battle of Britpop" incident in which Oasis and Blur had a chart battle over their respective singles "Roll with It" and "Country House" would propel them to mainstream awareness.

Despite the friction between the Gallagher brothers, Owen Morris reflected in 2010 that: "The sessions were the best, easiest, least fraught, most happily creative time I've ever had in a recording studio. I believe people can feel and hear when music is dishonest and motivated by the wrong reasons. Morning Glory, for all its imperfection and flaws, is dripping with love and happiness." Paul Weller joined them in the studio and provided lead guitar and backing vocals for "Champagne Supernova", and harmonica for the two untitled tracks known as "The Swamp Song". Noel wrote the last song for the album, "Cast No Shadow", on the train as he returned to the studio.

Morris claimed the album was recorded in 15 days, at a pace of one song a day. "Some Might Say" proved problematic to record: the backing track was recorded in one take after Noel Gallagher and Morris drunkenly listened to the demo and decided the new version was played too fast, and Noel woke the rest of the band to re-record it. The backing track was faster than intended, with what Morris described as "a really bad speed up during the first three bars of the first chorus", but the take had to be used because those involved were impressed with Liam's vocals, and Morris had to mix the track three times, using delay and other processing to hide the mistakes. When the album was finished, Morris said it would "wipe the field with any competition ... It's astonishing. It's the Bollocks for this decade." Creation Records boss Alan McGee was similarly enthused, saying that "You just cannot slag this record. It's gonna speak to real, working class lads in a way that a Suede or Radiohead could only dream of doing." The album's title was inspired by Noel's friend Melissa Lim answering the phone with said phrase, which is itself derived from a line in the song "The Telephone Hour" from the film Bye Bye Birdie.

The brickwall mastering technique used during the recording of the album has led to some journalists claiming that it was responsible for initiating the loudness war, as its heavy use of compression, first widely used by Morris on Definitely Maybe, was leaps and bounds beyond what any other album up until then had attempted. Music journalist Nick Southall, who has written extensively on the loudness war, commented, "If there's a jump-the-shark moment as far as CD mastering goes then it's probably Oasis." In Britpop and the English Music Tradition, Andy Bennett and Jon Stratton noted that as a result of this technique "the songs were especially loud. [Liam] Gallagher's voice is foregrounded to the point that it appears to grow out of the mixes of the songs, exposing itself to execute a pseudo-live quality."

Composition
The music on (What's the Story) Morning Glory? has been characterised by commentators as rock and Britpop. Music critic John Harris commented in his music history Britpop!: Cool Britannia and the Spectacular Demise of English Rock that much of the music seemed to be "little more inspired than a string of musical hand-me-downs". Among the musical cues Harris noted on the album were Gary Glitter's "Hello, Hello, I'm Back Again", John Lennon's "Imagine" ("Don't Look Back in Anger"), the theme to the 1970s children's programme You and Me and the Beatles' "With a Little Help from My Friends" ("She's Electric"), and the influence of R.E.M.'s "The One I Love" on "Morning Glory". One song, "Step Out", bore such a close resemblance to the song "Uptight (Everything's Alright)" by Stevie Wonder that it was removed from the album shortly before release due to the threat of legal action. Musicologist Allan F. Moore compares "She's Electric" to the Beatles' "When I'm Sixty-Four", writing that both songs can be claimed by an older generation. In Britpop ..., Bennett and Stratton analysed Liam Gallagher's vocal style in significant detail, stressing its importance to the songs of the album; "[Liam's] Mancunian accent blends into a register and timbre that works the gestural contours of the melody and lyrics." Bennett and Stratton went on to conclude that Liam's 'over-personalized' style on songs such as "Wonderwall" resulted in "a beautiful sense of sentimentality that bespeaks the despondency of a generation. This occurs through the narrative structure of the song, vocal production, and the conventions of the singer's cultural context."

Noel Gallagher summed up his own perspective on the album's aesthetic in an interview with Rolling Stone in 1995; "Whilst [Definitely Maybe] is about dreaming of being a pop star in a band, What's the Story is about actually being a pop star in a band." The album has a notable anthemic theme to its songs, differing from the raw-edged rock of Definitely Maybe. The use of string arrangements and more varied instrumentation in songs such as "Don't Look Back in Anger" and "Champagne Supernova" was a significant departure from the band's debut. This style had first been implemented by the band on their fifth single, "Whatever", released in December 1994. It was produced in conjunction with the London Symphony Orchestra, resulting in a much more pop-oriented and mellower sound; this would be the template that would come to define many of the songs on What's the Story. In the BBC documentary Seven Ages of Rock, former NME chief editor Steve Sutherland noted that "with Morning Glory, [Noel] began to take seriously the notion of being the voice of a generation".

Cover
The cover is a picture of two men passing each other on Berwick Street in London. The two men are London DJ Sean Rowley and album sleeve designer Brian Cannon (back to the camera).  The album's producer Owen Morris can be seen in the background, on the left footpath, holding the album's master tape in front of his face. The location was chosen because the street was a popular location for record shops at the time. The cover cost £25,000 to produce.

Promotion
While "Some Might Say", a number one hit, had been released in April, the single chosen to precede the album's release was "Roll with It", planned for release on 14 August, six weeks before the album was due to hit the shelves. This was an unorthodox method for the time, contrasting the standard industry procedure of releasing the lead single three weeks before its parent album. Blur's management had become worried that this would hinder the chances of the group's forthcoming "Country House" single reaching number one the following week. As a reaction, Food Records pushed the release of "Country House" back a week and thus started what became known as "The Battle of Britpop".

The event triggered an unprecedented amount of exposure for both bands in national newspapers and on television news bulletins, supposedly symbolising the battle between the middle class of the south and the working class of the north. In the midst of the battle a Guardian newspaper headline proclaimed "Working Class Heroes Lead Art School Trendies". In the event "Country House" outsold "Roll with It" by 54,000, and topped the singles chart for a fortnight. Overall singles sales that week were up by 41 per cent. In 2005, John Harris reflected on the importance of the event in popularising Britpop; "(as) Blur's "Country House" raced Oasis' "Roll with It" to the top of the charts, just about every voice in the media felt compelled to express an opinion on the freshly inaugurated age of Britpop."

During a promotional interview in September, the month before the album was released, Noel spoke about the rivalry with Damon Albarn and Alex James from Blur, and was quoted in the 17 September edition of The Observer saying he hoped "the pair of them would catch AIDS and die because I fucking hate them two." Although Noel recanted and said that AIDS is no laughing matter, the quote caused a storm of controversy, with Noel having to write a letter of apology; he later confessed that "my whole world came crashing down in on me then". However, in an interview with The Guardian in 2005, Blur's guitarist Graham Coxon explained that he bore no malice towards Oasis. "At least they were outright about it. They weren't pretending to like us and then slagging us off, which is what we'd been used to. In that way, I quite appreciated them."

On 2 October 2018, to mark the 23rd anniversary of the album release, a new lyric video for the track "She's Electric", described as being "loaded with psychedelic imagery", was published on the band's YouTube VEVO channel.

Release
(What's the Story) Morning Glory? was released on 2 October 1995. The album sold quickly; the Daily Express reported the day after release that central London HMV stores were selling copies of the album at a rate of two per minute. At the end of the first week of sales, the album had sold a record-breaking 345,000 copies, making it (at the time) the second-fastest-selling album in British history, behind Michael Jackson's Bad. After initially entering the UK charts at number one, it hovered around the top three for the rest of the year before initiating a six-week stay at the top in mid January, followed by a further three weeks at number one in March. In total, the album did not leave the top three for an astonishing seven months. In addition, by the time of its one-year anniversary in October 1996 the album had remained in the top ten for all but one week, in which it charted at number eleven.

After the fourth single from the album, "Wonderwall", hit the top ten in several countries, including stays at number one in Australia and New Zealand and achieving a peak of number eight in the United States, the album began to enjoy prolonged international success. Eventually the album had a five-week run at the top of the Australian albums chart and an eight-week run at the top of the New Zealand albums chart before topping charts in Canada, Ireland, Sweden and Switzerland. The album was also making significant waves in the US market, thanks in part to the success of the "Wonderwall" and "Champagne Supernova" singles on American modern rock radio. Both songs reached number one on the Modern Rock Tracks chart and stayed there for ten and five weeks respectively. By early 1996, What's the Story was selling 200,000 copies a week, eventually peaking at number four and being certified four times platinum by the end of the year for shipments of over four million units. "Wonderwall" also topped the Australian and New Zealand singles charts.

Tour

The band embarked on what would become a 103 show world tour in support of the album over a period of several months in 1995 and 1996. The tour started on 22 June 1995 with a pre-Glastonbury festival warm-up gig at the 1,400 capacity Bath Pavilion, which featured the debut of new drummer Alan White and several new songs off the album, and ended on 4 December 1996 at the 11,800 capacity Mayo Civic Centre in Rochester, Minnesota, USA, and included concerts at Earls Court in November 1995 and Cardiff International Arena in March 1996. The tour had many disruptions and cancellations due to Noel twice walking out of the group, and Liam pulling out of a US leg.

In September 1995, bass player Paul "Guigsy" McGuigan walked out on the group after he was subjected to a flurry of verbal abuse from Liam while doing interviews in Paris. McGuigan cited nervous exhaustion as the reason for his departure. Scott McLeod of The Ya-Yas was brought in as his replacement; though, despite playing a string of gigs with the band and appearing in the video for the "Wonderwall" single, McLeod was unable to adapt to the frenetic celebrity lifestyle, duly returning to Manchester halfway through an American promotional tour for the album. The band played a few dates, including an appearance on Late Show with David Letterman, as a four piece, before McGuigan was convinced to return for the group's Earls Court shows in early November. When the band broke up for a brief time in late 1996, several US tour dates and the entire Australia and New Zealand leg had to be cancelled.

As the band began to reach the peak of their popularity, several large open-air concerts were organised in the UK during 1996, including two gigs at Manchester City football stadium Maine Road, two nights at Loch Lomond in Scotland, and two nights at Knebworth House in front of a record 125,000 people each night; an event that would come to be acknowledged as the height of the Britpop phenomenon, with one journalist commenting; "(Knebworth) could be seen as the last great Britpop performance; nothing after would match its scale." At the time, the concerts were the biggest gigs ever held for a single band on UK soil, and to date remain the largest demand ever for a British concert; with reportedly over 2.5 million applications for tickets. The Earl's Court and Maine Road gigs were filmed and later released as the Oasis VHS/DVD ...There and Then.

Reception

(What's the Story) Morning Glory? was released to lukewarm reviews from the mainstream music press. Many contemporary reviewers expressed disappointment at the album's perceived inferiority to Definitely Maybe, taking aim at the "banal lyrics" and the unoriginal nature of the compositions. David Cavanagh of Q magazine said of the lyrics: "They scan; they fill a hole; end of story. They [say] nothing much about anything." Andy Gill of The Independent commented that "She's Electric" is "laddism of a tiresomely generic kind", while "Roll with It" is "drab and chummy". In Spin, Chuck Eddy wrote that the band had eschewed the "Bowie glitter" of their debut for "generic classic rock", while Chicago Tribune critic Greg Kot felt that they lacked a distinguishing "attitude" despite being "modestly tuneful". While stating that "Some Might Say" was "the best single of the year", David Stubbs of Melody Maker was critical of the album as a whole; "What's the Story [sounds] laboured and lazy. On this evidence, Oasis are a limited band ... they sound knackered."

NME was more enthusiastic, with the magazine's John Robinson writing that the album shows Oasis pursuing "an altogether different direction; away from the conscience-free overloaded hedonism towards an understanding of its consequences". Rolling Stones Jon Wiederhorn wrote that "What's the Story is more than a natural progression, it's a bold leap forward that displays significant musical and personal growth." He went on to note that the "stormy" relationship between Liam and Noel proved to be one of the album's strengths; "tension and instability have been inherent traits of great rock teams ... for Oasis, the addition of shared genes gives their songs extra impact and dimension." Los Angeles Times critic Robert Hilburn welcomed the album as a counterpoint to the prevailing "despair" of the decade's rock music. The album finished 10th in the voting for The Village Voices annual Pazz & Jop critics' poll. The poll's curator Robert Christgau initially assessed it as "phony Beatlemania"; he later gave it a two-star honourable mention, indicating a "likable effort that consumers attuned to its overriding aesthetic or individual vision may well enjoy", and quipped "give them credit for wanting it all—and (yet another Beatles connection!) playing guitars". Select ranked the album at number two on its end-of-year list of the 50 best albums of 1995.

In his book Britpop!, John Harris concluded that the initial negative reviews of the time missed the album's universal strengths. "Those who fussed about the music's more artful aspects were missing the point. The fact that [Noel's] songs contained so many musical echoes seemed to couch the album in an air of homely reassurance." Harris believed that the "ordinary" nature of some of the album's songs "turned out to be part of its deeply populist appeal".

Battle of Britpop 
The album's release alongside Blur's The Great Escape came at the height of the so-called "Battle of Britpop". Despite some genuine enmity between the two bands, this was a primarily media-constructed pitting of the more classic rock-focused, working-class northern band Oasis against the middle-class, musically more eclectic Blur. Released around the same time as (What's the Story?) Morning Glory, The Great Escape was initially widely praised by critics, far more so than Oasis' effort. However, as Oasis gained popularity and acclaim, critical consensus around 'The Great Escape' was revised, with Q magazine even apologising for its original review. BBC Music writer James McMahon recalled how the "critical euphoria" surrounding the album lasted "about as long as it took publishers to realise Oasis would probably shift more magazines for them". The media's switch to Oasis has led to the band's critical acclaim being questioned in the years since Britpop. Additionally, the critical lauding awarded by numerous critics to Oasis out of a desire to grow sales of their own publications, rather than genuinely reviewing the album for its strengths and weaknesses alone, is recognised as a leading factor in the alleged "over-hype" of Morning Glory's follow up Be Here Now.

Legacy

(What's the Story) Morning Glory? is considered an important record of the Britpop era and one of the best albums of the nineties, and it appears in several lists as one of the greatest albums of all time. Rob Sheffield, writing in The Rolling Stone Album Guide (2004), called the album "a triumph, full of bluster and bravado but also moments of surprising tenderness", adding that it "capped a true golden age for Britpop". Rolling Stone ranked the album at 378 on its 2012 list of "the 500 Greatest Albums of All Time" and at 157 on its 2020 list. Spin included it at 79 in their list of "The 300 Best Albums of 1985–2014". The album's enduring popularity within the UK was reflected when it won the British Album of 30 Years award at the 2010 Brit Awards. The award was voted by the public to decide the greatest Album of the Year winner in the history of the Brit Awards. The album was also included in the book 1001 Albums You Must Hear Before You Die. It was voted number 21 in Colin Larkin's All Time Top 1000 Albums. 
The Encyclopedia of Popular Music stated that "it was undeniably a gigantic album".  
What's the Story went on to become the best-selling album of the decade in the UK, with its sixteen platinum certifications from the British Phonographic Industry. It was also certified four times platinum by the Recording Industry Association of America. The sixteen platinum certifications in the UK were the highest ever awarded to a single record until Adele's 21, released in 2011. The success of the album resulted in Oasis becoming one of the biggest bands in the world, with substantial and considerable press coverage in the mainstream music press and frequent comparisons to the Beatles in the media. Liam and Noel Gallagher both featured prominently in gossip columns and daily tabloids throughout 1996–97.

What's the Story propelled Oasis from being a crossover indie act to a worldwide rock phenomenon after the momentum gained by the critically acclaimed Definitely Maybe. It has been pinpointed by music critics as a significant record in the timeline of British indie music, demonstrating just how far into the mainstream independent music had ventured. In 2005, John Harris noted the significance of the album and "Wonderwall" in particular to Britpop's legacy. "When (Oasis) released Wonderwall, the rules of British music were decisively changed. From hereon in, the lighter-than-air ballad became obligatory, and the leather-trousers era of rock'n'roll was over." The success of the album in Britain resulted in Oasis becoming a cultural ubiquity for a brief period, featuring in tabloid newspapers on an almost daily basis and breaking sales records for live concerts.

Track listing

Original release

Vinyl version

Singles box set

The (What's the Story) Morning Glory? box set was released on 4 November 1996, featuring four discs of singles, including B-sides, and one disc of interviews. The album charted at number 24 on the UK Albums Chart.

All songs written by Noel Gallagher, except "Cum On Feel the Noize" by Noddy Holder and Jim Lea; "Step Out" co-written by Stevie Wonder, Henry Cosby and Sylvia Moy.

Chart position

Certifications

2014 reissue
As part of a promotional campaign entitled Chasing the Sun, the album was re-released on 29 September 2014. The 3-disc deluxe edition includes remastered versions of the album and its associated b-sides from the four UK singles. Bonus content includes 5 demo tracks, and live choices taken from the band's iconic gigs at Earls Court, Knebworth Park and Maine Road.

Personnel
Oasis
 Liam Gallagher – vocals (1–3, 5, 7–10, 12)
 Noel Gallagher – lead guitar, backing vocals, lead vocals (4), Mellotron, piano, EBow, bass (3, 6, 8–9, 11), production
 Paul "Bonehead" Arthurs – rhythm guitar (1–2, 4–12), Mellotron (3), piano, Hammond organ (4)
 Paul "Guigsy" McGuigan – bass (1–2, 4–5, 7, 10, 12)
 Alan White – drums, percussion (1–6, 8–12)

Additional musicians
 Mark Feltham – harmonica (6, 11)
 Tony McCarroll – drums (7)
 Brian Cannon – keyboards (10)
 Paul Weller – lead guitar, backing vocals (12)

Additional personnel
 Owen Morris – production
Neil Dorfsman – multichannel mixing (SACD version)
 David Swope – assistant mixing (SACD version)
Barry Grint – original audio mastering at Abbey Road Studios
Vlado Meller – mastering (SACD version)
 Michael Spencer Jones – photography
 Brian Cannon – artwork, design
 Mathew Sankey – assistant design

Charts

Weekly charts

Year-end charts

Decade-end charts

All-time charts

Certifications and sales

See also
 List of best-selling albums in the United Kingdom
 List of best-selling albums
 Top best-selling albums by UK Chart
 Loudness war

References
Footnotes

Bibliography
 
 
 
 
 Seven Ages of Rock: What the World is Waiting For. BBC, 2007.

External links
 

1995 albums
Creation Records albums
Epic Records albums
Oasis (band) albums
Albums involved in plagiarism controversies
Albums produced by Owen Morris
Albums recorded at Rockfield Studios
Brit Award for British Album of the Year